Veland is a surname. Notable people with the surname include:

Morten Veland (born 1977), Norwegian musician, composer, songwriter, and producer
Tony Veland (born 1973), American football player